Pichl-Kainisch is a former municipality in the Salzkammergut in the Liezen (district) Austrian state of Styria. Since the 2015 Styria municipal structural reform, it is part of the municipality Bad Mitterndorf.

Population

References

Cities and towns in Liezen District